Nataliya Lyapina, Ukr. Наталія Ляпіна (née Datsenko; born 14 May 1976) is a Ukrainian team handball player. She received a bronze medal with the Ukrainian national team at the 2004 Summer Olympics in Athens.

References

External links

1976 births
Living people
Ukrainian female handball players
Handball players at the 2004 Summer Olympics
Olympic bronze medalists for Ukraine
Olympic medalists in handball 

Medalists at the 2004 Summer Olympics
20th-century Ukrainian women
21st-century Ukrainian women